The 2019–20 season is Sepahan's 66th season in existence, and their 39th consecutive season in the top flight of Iran football. It is also the club's 19th consecutive season in the Persian Gulf Pro League. The club will compete in the Persian Gulf Pro League, Hazfi Cup, and AFC Champions League.

First-team squad 

As it stands on 8 October 2019

Transfers and loans

Transfers in

Transfers out

Loans out

Pre-season

Competitions

Overall

Overview

Pro League

League table

Results summary

Results by matchday

Matches

Hazfi Cup

Matches

AFC Champions League

Squad statistics

Appearances

Goals

References

External links
  Club Official Website
  The Club page in Soccerway.com
  The Club page in Persianleague.com

 
Sepahan